Årlifoss Station was a railway station serving Årlifoss in Notodden, Norway on the Tinnoset Line from 1914 to the line closed in 1991.

Designed by Thorvald Astrup it opened in 1914 as Aarlifoss. It got the current name in April 1924, but downgraded to a stop on 1 March 1924. On 12 July 1982 it was moved 34 meters and the station building razed. It was closed along with the railway on 1 January 1991.

References

External links
 Norwegian Railway Club entry

Railway stations on the Tinnoset Line
Railway stations in Notodden
Railway stations opened in 1914
Railway stations closed in 1991
Disused railway stations in Norway
1914 establishments in Norway
1991 disestablishments in Norway